Three ships of the French Navy have borne the name Donawerth, in honour of the battle of Donauwörth during the Ulm Campaign :
 , an 80-gun Tonnant-class ship of the line
 , an 80-gun ship of the line
 , an 80-gun ship of the line renamed Donawerth in 1868

French Navy ship names